Elizabeth II was proclaimed queen throughout the Commonwealth after her father, King George VI, died in the early hours of 6 February 1952, while Elizabeth was in Kenya. Proclamations were made in different Commonwealth realms on 6, 7, 8, and 11 February (depending on geographic location and time zone). The line of succession was identical in all the Commonwealth realms, but the royal title as proclaimed was not the same in all of them. Accession was followed sixteen months later by the Coronation of Elizabeth II at Westminster Abbey in London on 2 June 1953.

United Kingdom
In the United Kingdom, the Accession Council met twice at St James's Palace: first at 5 p.m. on Wednesday, 6 February, before the Queen had returned from Kenya, to make their proclamation declaring the accession of the new sovereign, as the late king's successor in accordance with the line of succession to the British throne, and, second, at a meeting begun at 10 a.m. on Friday, 8 February, when the Queen was present, to receive her oath for the security of the Church of Scotland and her personal declaration that she would always work to uphold constitutional government and to advance the happiness and prosperity of her peoples all the world over. Her declaration for securing the Protestant succession, as required by the 1689 Bill of Rights and the Accession Declaration Act 1910, was made later, at the next state opening of parliament, on 4 November.

After the Accession Council had completed the formalities for their proclamation on 6 February, it had been issued for publication in a supplement to that day's London Gazette:

The accession proclamation was published in The Times on 7 February, quoting the London Gazette. According to the Times, it was expected that the public proclamation would be made in due form by the heralds of the College of Arms. The practice had been to read it first from the Friary Court balcony at St James's Palace and, in the City of London, the custom had been to lay it before the Court of Aldermen and to read it, after a ceremony at Temple Bar, London, at the corner of Chancery Lane, in Fleet Street, and at the Royal Exchange.

After the meeting with the Queen at St James's Palace in the morning of 8 February, the accession proclamation was read to the public by the Garter King of Arms, Sir George Bellew, first at 11 a.m. from the Friary Court balcony, then in Trafalgar Square, in Fleet Street, and at the Royal Exchange.

Other Commonwealth realms
Each of the Commonwealth realms issued similar proclamations of the accession of the Queen.

Australia

The Governor-General of Australia, Sir William McKell, issued the proclamation of Elizabeth's accession as Queen of Australia on Thursday, 7 February. It was read from the steps of Parliament House. Similar proclamations were issued on Friday, 8 February in New South Wales, South Australia, Victoria and Western Australia.

Canada
The Queen's Privy Council for Canada issued the first proclamation of the Queen's accession, doing so on Wednesday, 6 February. It was read at Rideau Hall, in both French and English.

Ceylon
In Ceylon, the Queen was proclaimed separately as the Queen of Ceylon through a proclamation signed by the Governor-General and the members of the Cabinet. On the morning of February 8, 1952, this proclamation was read from the steps of Parliament House, Colombo in three principal languages of Ceylon: English, Sinhalese and Tamil, to the large crowds outside. A gun-salute was also fired. The bands played God Save The Queen and Namo Namo Matha.

New Zealand
The Governor-General of New Zealand, Sir Bernard Freyberg, proclaimed the Queen's accession in New Zealand on Monday, 11 February, attended by the Chief Justice, Sir Humphrey O'Leary, Deputy Prime Minister Keith Holyoake, and members of the Executive Council, who took the oath of allegiance after the ceremony. The proclamation was signed by the Governor-General, the members of the Executive Council and others.

Pakistan
In Pakistan, the proclamation on 8 February was surrounded by some of the old splendours of the former Imperial times. A salute of 21 guns was also fired.

The proclamation, which was signed by the Secretary to the Government of Pakistan, was shorter than those issued in other Commonwealth realms, simply stating, "The Governor-General proclaims that Her Majesty Queen Elizabeth the Second is now become Queen of Her Realms and Territories and Head of the Commonwealth."

South Africa
The Governor-General of the Union of South Africa, Ernest George Jansen, proclaimed the Queen's accession in Cape Town on Thursday, 7 February, in English and in Afrikaans.

Crown colonies
In Bermuda, Governor Alexander Hood read the proclamation of the Queen's accession from a small dais near the steps of the Public Buildings on 8 February. The ceremony, witnessed by a crowd of several thousand people, concluded by playing of the National Anthem, and then a 21-gun salute at Hamilton harbour. When the salute was over, the Governor called for "three cheers for Her Majesty the Queen", waving his helmet in his right hand.

In Singapore, the proclamation was made by the Governor at a ceremony attended by thousands on the Padang on 9 February 1952.

After the announcement of George VI's death had been formally communicated to the Legislative Board of Turks and Caicos Islands (at that time a dependency of Jamaica, itself then a Crown colony), a proclamation was issued and published there on Friday, 8 February.

Similar proclamations were issued in Southern Rhodesia, on 8 February in Barbados, Cyprus, the Falkland Islands, Grenada, Kenya, Mauritius,  Saint Vincent, Seychelles, and Trinidad and Tobago, and on 9 February in Hong Kong, and Sarawak.

Royal title
The proclamation in the United Kingdom marked the first inclusion, by an Accession Council, of the title Head of the Commonwealth, and the first reference to "representatives of other Members of the Commonwealth" as among those proclaiming. Also, the Crown, which had been referred to as the Imperial Crown of Great Britain and Ireland, was also now non-specific, and Elizabeth's title was not her official one. These last two points reflected the existence of the Republic of Ireland (Ireland would not be officially removed from the Queen's title until the year following), as well as the sovereignty of countries over which Elizabeth was now separately queen. However, the Canadian proclamation, necessarily separate due to the country's legal independence from the UK, continued to refer to the new sovereign as Queen of Ireland, and the Crown she inherited as being that of "Great Britain, Ireland and all other His late Majesty's dominions." Elizabeth was also proclaimed Queen of Ireland in South Africa.

Changes of the royal style and title in any realm do not as such change the constitutional status or position of the monarch or the Crown.

See also
 Executive Council (Commonwealth countries)
 Privy council
 Royal Style and Titles Act
 Proclamation of accession of Charles III (2022)

References

External links
 Queen Elizabeth II proclaimed at the Royal Exchange, 6 February 1952
 Accession Council's first meeting and proclamation
 Queen's declaration made in the council of 8 February 1952
 Ceremonial observed at the proclamation in London
 Ceremonial observed at the proclamation at Mercat Cross, Edinburgh

British monarchy
Monarchy in Canada
Monarchy in Australia
Monarchy in New Zealand
Elizabeth II
Proclamations
February 1952 events
February 1952 events in the United Kingdom
1952 in the United Kingdom
1952 in Canada
1952 in Australia
1952 in New Zealand
1952 in South Africa
1952 in Pakistan
1952 in Ceylon
1952 in the British Empire